Society Hill Synagogue is a synagogue located in the Society Hill section of Center City, Philadelphia. The synagogue is home to a 300-household congregation with Shabbat and holiday services, a Playschool for children 18 months to 5 years old, a Hebrew School for pre-kindergartners through high school students, adult education, social and communal activities, impactful social action, and engaging intergenerational programs.

History
Society Hill Synagogue is located at 418 Spruce Street. The building was designed by architect Thomas Ustick Walter in 1829 to serve as the home of the Spruce Street Baptist Church. Congregation Beth Hamedrash Hagadol Nusach Ashkenaz purchased the building in 1910. Within three years, the synagogue's official name was changed to the Roumanian American Congregation, also known as "Or Chodash-Agudas Achim" (New Light-Union of Brethren). That congregation was succeeded by Society Hill Synagogue, which continues to operate in the historic property and built the synagogue's adjacent Paula Kline Learning Center in 2021. The historic building entered the National Register of Historic Places in June 1971.

Spruce Street Baptist Church
Former members of First Baptist Church commissioned Thomas Ustick Walter to design the building at 418 Spruce Street in 1829. Walter also served as clerk of the church and superintendent of the Sunday school. In 1851, the church was enlarged, and a new façade with an attic story was designed by Walter with cupolas over the side bays of the façade. The congregation made additions to the rear of the building in 1871 and 1877.

Spruce Street Baptist Church moved to 50th and Spruce Streets in 1908, and in 1963 to Newtown Square where it continues as an active congregation.

Great Roumanian Shul
The building was sold at auction in 1910 and was purchased by the Roumanian American Congregation, which represented the merger of Or Chodash and Agudas Achim Congregations. Or Chodash was organized in 1886 as a beneficial society with daily services held in the second floor at 512 S. Third Street. Agudas Achim was organized in 1905.

The synagogue became commonly known as the Great Roumanian Shul (דיא גרויסע רומענישע שוהל). It served the Philadelphia Jewish Quarter's Eastern European Jews in general, and was the center for the city's Roumanian Jewish community and fraternal organizations, hosting meetings and speakers. The Roumanian synagogue hosted Dr. Wilhelm Filderman for a mass meeting during a visit to Philadelphia in March 1926.

Society Hill declined in the years following World War II. Immigrant Jewish communities assimilated, moved to suburbs, membership declined, and by the 1960s, the synagogue building had fallen into disrepair.

Society Hill Synagogue
 In the 1960s, a new community of Jews in the Society Hill neighborhood were looking for a spiritual home. This new congregation purchased the building in 1967.

Restoration began in 1968 under the supervision of architect Henry J. Magaziner. The restoration cost $300,000 and included updates to the 1829 building, repair of Walter's façade, and the addition of air-conditioning, a contemporary kitchen, and a new social area. There were approximately 100 member families at the time.

Additional work in 1971 was directed by Cauffman, Wilkenson & Pepper, with John Milner. The building is listed as a Philadelphia City Landmark and is on the state and National Registers of Historic Places. In 1985, architect James A. Oleg Kruhly designed a new addition. In 2005, the synagogue completed more than $80,000 worth of interior work, which included adding a permanent Beit Midrash.

The synagogue purchased the building next door, to its west, to add classrooms in 2007, and in 2009 secured a grant for repairs to the envelope of the 19th century sanctuary and annex. Between 2007 and 2019, Society Hill Synagogue raised more than $4 million in order to purchase its neighoring building and undertake major construction and renovation throughout its two buildings. Construction began in 2020 and was completed in 2021. In June 2021, the synagogue opened its new adjacent three-story Paula Kline Learning Center, which is connected to the historic synagogue building by a multistory gallery annex. The construction and space improvements expanded the historic building's Social Hall, renovated the Beit Midrash, built six new classrooms, developed a large private courtyard behind the two properties, and added an Americans with Disabilities Act-compliant elevator and ADA-compliant restrooms.

The congregation is independent, and its services are based on Conservative liturgy while incorporating influences from the Reconstructionist, Renewal, and Reform movements, and beyond. Society Hill Synagogue embraces its diverse membership, including interfaith couples and families, LGBTQ+ individuals and families, people of color, and people of all abilities.

Ivan Caine served as Rabbi from the congregation's founding in 1967 until 2001. In the mid-1970s, Rabbi Caine also served as a part-time Rabbi to Congregation Kesher Israel around the corner in the neighborhood. Cantor Alan Cohn served the synagogue from 1974 through 2000.

Avi Winokur served as Rabbi from 2001 to 2020. Nathan Kamesar was hired as Associate Rabbi in 2018 and succeeded Rabbi Winokur as Rabbi in July 2020. Hazzan Jessi Roemer has served as Cantor since 2018. The congregation now has more than 300 member households, almost 70 children ages 18 months-5 years enrolled in its Playschool, and over 80 children from ages 4-16 enrolled in its Hebrew School.

References

External links 

Facebook Page - Society Hill Synagogue
Instagram - Society Hill Synagogue

Ashkenazi Jewish culture in Philadelphia
Ashkenazi synagogues
Society Hill, Philadelphia
Synagogues in Philadelphia
Tourist attractions in Philadelphia
Synagogues on the National Register of Historic Places in Pennsylvania
Unaffiliated synagogues in Pennsylvania
1829 establishments in Pennsylvania
Synagogues completed in 1829